The 2006 Portuguese motorcycle Grand Prix was the sixteenth race of the 2006 Motorcycle Grand Prix season. It took place on the weekend of 13–15 October 2006 at the Estoril circuit. This was the last race won by a non-factory team before the 2016 Dutch TT.

MotoGP classification

250 cc classification

125 cc classification

Championship standings after the race (MotoGP)

Below are the standings for the top five riders and constructors after round sixteen has concluded.

Riders' Championship standings

Constructors' Championship standings

 Note: Only the top five positions are included for both sets of standings.

References

Portuguese motorcycle Grand Prix
Portuguese
Motorcycle Grand Prix